Sara Sothern (born Sara Viola Warmbrodt; August 21, 1895 – September 11, 1994) was an American stage actress and the mother of actress Elizabeth Taylor.

Life and career
Sothern was born Sara Viola Warmbrodt in Arkansas City, Kansas, the daughter of Elizabeth Ann (née Wilson; February 10, 1864 – February 7, 1932) and Samuel Sylvester Warmbrodt (October 8, 1861 – January 6, 1948), son of Samuel Warmbrodt, from Switzerland.

Her film debut was on One of the Flames (1914) which was filmed at the Miller Brothers 101 Ranch. Sothern was a seasoned actress by the time she made her Broadway debut in The Dagger (1925), followed by Arabesque and Fool's Bells that same year. She next appeared in Mama Loves Papa (1926). During this time, she acted in plays across the U.S., including the theatre venues of downtown Los Angeles. 

She married art dealer Francis Lenn Taylor in 1926 in New York City. They were the parents of Howard Taylor (27 June 1929 – 31 August 2020), and the movie star Elizabeth Taylor (19322011). After marrying, Sothern retired from the stage and never acted again. After living in England several years, where her children were born, they returned to the United States. Living in Los Angeles, California, she devoted herself to her family and the movie career of her daughter. 

Sothern died on September 11, 1994, less than a month after her 99th birthday in Palm Springs, California. She is interred in Westwood Village Memorial Park, Los Angeles.

References

External links

 

1895 births
1994 deaths
20th-century American actresses
Actresses from Kansas
American expatriates in the United Kingdom
American people of Swiss descent
American stage actresses
Elizabeth Taylor
People from Arkansas City, Kansas
Actresses from Los Angeles
Burials at Westwood Village Memorial Park Cemetery